"Come On Eileen" is a song by the English group Dexys Midnight Runners (credited to Dexys Midnight Runners and the Emerald Express), released in the United Kingdom in June 1982 as a single from their second studio album Too-Rye-Ay. It reached number one in the United States and was their second number one hit in the UK, following 1980's "Geno". The song was produced by Clive Langer and Alan Winstanley and was initially claimed to be written by Kevin Rowland, Jim Paterson and Billy Adams, although Rowland later stated that the essence of the tune should be attributed to Kevin Archer.

"Come On Eileen" won Best British Single at the 1983 Brit Awards, and in 2015 the song was voted by the British public as the nation's sixth favourite 1980s number one single in a poll for ITV. It was ranked number eighteen on VH1's "100 Greatest Songs of the '80s" and was Britain's best-selling single of 1982.

Composition
There are various versions of the song; some, in addition to the main section, feature either a Celtic fiddle-solo intro or an a cappella coda, both based on Thomas Moore's Irish folk song "Believe Me, if All Those Endearing Young Charms".
	
The main section begins with a Celtic-style fiddle played over a drum beat, with the bass guitar and piano providing accompaniment.

The lyrics of the song begin with the lines:

The bridge of "Come On Eileen" features an improvised counter-melody which begins in a slow tempo and grows faster and faster over an accelerando vocal backing. The chord sequence of the bridge is actually the same as the verses, but transposed up by a whole tone.

Throughout the song, there are numerous tempo changes and key changes:

Although often believed to have been inspired by a childhood friend with whom Kevin Rowland had a romantic, and later sexual, relationship in his teens, there was actually no real Eileen. "In fact she was composite, to make a point about Catholic repression."

Music video
The 1982 music video was directed by Julien Temple and filmed in the inner south London suburb of Kennington in the vicinity of the corner of Brook Drive and Hayles Street, then Austral Street and Holyoak Road. The character of "Eileen" in the music video, as well as on the single cover, is played by Máire Fahey, sister of Siobhan Fahey from Bananarama.

Archival footage of Johnnie Ray arriving at London Heathrow Airport in 1954 was featured in the video.

Chart success
In a 2000 poll by Channel 4, the song was placed at number 38 in the 100 greatest number one singles of all time. Similar polls by the music channel VH1 placed the song at number three in their "100 Greatest One Hit Wonders" of all time, number 18 in their "100 Greatest Songs of the '80s" and number one in their "100 Greatest One-Hit Wonders of the '80s". (While the group had a previous number one single in the UK with "Geno" in 1980, "Come On Eileen" was their only US hit.) As of June 2013, "Come On Eileen" had sold 1.33 million copies in the UK.

The song reached number one in the United States on the Billboard Hot 100 charts during the week ending 23 April 1983. "Come On Eileen" prevented Michael Jackson from having back-to-back number one hits in the US: "Billie Jean" was the number one single the previous seven weeks, while "Beat It" was the number one song the ensuing three.

Weekly charts

Year-end charts

Certifications and sales

"Come On England" version
In 2004, the band 4-4-2 was formed to cover the song as "Come On England" with altered lyrics to support the England national football team during their appearance in the 2004 European Championships.

See also
List of number-one singles in Australia during the 1980s
List of best-selling singles by year in the United Kingdom
List of Billboard Hot 100 number-one singles of 1983
List of Cash Box Top 100 number-one singles of 1983
List of number-one singles of 1982 (Ireland)
List of number-one singles from the 1980s (New Zealand)
List of number-one singles of the 1980s (Switzerland)
List of UK Singles Chart number ones of the 1980s

References

1982 songs
1982 singles
1983 singles
Dexys Midnight Runners songs
Blue-eyed soul songs
Brit Award for British Single
Billboard Hot 100 number-one singles
Cashbox number-one singles
Irish Singles Chart number-one singles
Mercury Records singles
Music videos directed by Julien Temple
Number-one singles in Australia
Number-one singles in New Zealand
Number-one singles in South Africa
Number-one singles in Switzerland
Song recordings produced by Clive Langer
Song recordings produced by Alan Winstanley
Songs written by Kevin Rowland
UK Singles Chart number-one singles
Ultratop 50 Singles (Flanders) number-one singles